Agias (Gr. ) can refer to a number of people from classical history:
Agias, an epic poet from the 8th century BC
Agias of Sparta, an ancient seer

Agias, the author of a work on Argolis, the Argolica, according to Athenaeus (iii).  He is called a musician in another passage (xiv) but this may be a different person.

Ancient Greek writers known only from secondary sources